Eppo or EPPO may refer to:

 European and Mediterranean Plant Protection Organization
 European Public Prosecutor's Office
 Poznań–Ławica Airport, by ICAO code
 Eppo (comics), a Dutch comic magazine

People with the name
 Michael Eppelstun, Australian surfer
 Eppo Bruins (born 1969), Dutch politician
 Eppo Cremers (1923–1896), Dutch politician
 Eppo Doeve (1907–1981), Dutch painter and cartoonist